Martino Borghese (born 5 June 1987) is a Swiss footballer of Italian descent who plays as a defender for Locarno.

Career
After playing for many Italian sides (playing mostly for Serie C1 or Serie C2 clubs), he was promoted to Serie B with A.S. Gubbio 1910 and was transferred to A.S. Bari in July 2011.

In January 2014 he was loaned to Swiss club Lugano.

In 2015, he was signed by Calcio Como. In 2016, he was signed by Livorno with Tonći Kukoč moved to opposite direction.

On 1 September 2018, he returned to Como, this time in the fourth-tier Serie D.

For the 2019–20 season, Como was promoted to Serie C, but Borghese moved to Serie D club Seregno. On 31 January 2022, Borghese's contract with Seregno was terminated by mutual consent.

On 16 February 2022, Borghese returned to Switzerland and signed with Locarno.

Honours
Gubbio
 Serie C1: 2010–11 (Group A)

Livorno
 Serie C: 2017–18 (Group A)

References

External links
 
 

1987 births
Living people
Footballers from Basel
Italian people of Swiss descent
Swiss men's footballers
Italian footballers
Association football defenders
Serie B players
Serie C players
Serie D players
Genoa C.F.C. players
U.S. Viterbese 1908 players
Delfino Pescara 1936 players
Pol. Alghero players
A.S. Gubbio 1910 players
S.S.C. Bari players
F.C. Pro Vercelli 1892 players
Spezia Calcio players
FC Lugano players
S.S.D. Varese Calcio players
Como 1907 players
U.S. Livorno 1915 players
U.S. 1913 Seregno Calcio players
FC Locarno players
Swiss expatriate footballers
Swiss expatriate sportspeople in Italy
Expatriate footballers in Italy